Anotylus insignitus is a species of spiny-legged rove beetle in the family Staphylinidae. It is found in Africa, the Caribbean, Central America, North America, Oceania, South America, and Europe.

References

Further reading

 

Oxytelinae
Articles created by Qbugbot
Beetles described in 1806